Michel Camdessus (born 1 May 1933) is a French economist who served as the seventh managing director of the International Monetary Fund (IMF) from 1987 to 2000, the longest serving in that position. He previously served as the Governor of the Banque de France from 1984 to 1987. Before that, he briefly served as deputy governor of the Banque de France from August until November 1984 when elevated to the top position.

Among the most important events of his tenure at IMF was 1997 East Asian financial crisis. His role has been criticized for not paying attention to the unique circumstances of the East Asian countries and blindly imposing the measures that were followed in Mexico, leading to considerable turmoil and rioting in countries such as Indonesia.

Born in Bayonne, France, Mr. Camdessus was educated at the University of Paris and earned postgraduate degrees in economics at Institut d'Etudes Politiques de Paris (Sciences Po) in Paris and École nationale d'administration.

He is currently president of the social initiative  (French social weeks) and is a member of the Commission for Africa established by Tony Blair. He is also a member of the Pontifical Commission for Justice and Peace.

Camdessus is a member of the Africa Progress Panel (APP), a group of ten distinguished individuals who advocate at the highest levels for equitable and sustainable development in Africa. As a Panel Member, he facilitates coalition building to leverage and broker knowledge, in addition to convening decision-makers to influence policy and create lasting change in Africa.

Camdessus is also a member of the Fondation Chirac's board of directors, ever since the foundation was launched in 2008 by former French president Jacques Chirac to promote world peace. He also participates in the jury for the Conflict Prevention Prize awarded every year by this foundation, and in the scientific committee of its Water and Sanitation program.

References

External links

 Biographical Information (IMF)
 Biography on Africa Progress panel website

Links to Camdessus' articles and speeches
 
 Matteo Ricci, spiritual resources and partnership
 Globalization and the Future of Humankind
 Ethics and Finance in a Globalizing World
 The Sustainability of Sustainability

1933 births
Living people
Sciences Po alumni
École nationale d'administration alumni
Governors of the Banque de France
Managing directors of the International Monetary Fund
Commission for Africa members
French economists
Grand Officiers of the Légion d'honneur
Knights of the Ordre national du Mérite
French officials of the United Nations